Sky Shield is an advanced airborne electronic warfare system for fighter jets developed by Rafael Advanced Defense Systems of Israel.

The electronic warfare pod is an all-inclusive multi-purpose escort jammer and electronic attack system. Sky Shield engages enemy radars in hostile environments, providing comprehensive electronic countermeasures against enemy threats. The system creates a corridor for multiple attacking aircraft, thus increasing aircraft survivability in time and providing attack options. The Sky Shield pod covers frequency spectrum range from D band to KU band and includes a digital interferometer system for signal detection, a DRFM based technique generator and a modular solid-state active electronically scanned array transmitter for jamming.

The system was purchased by the Brazilian Air Force in 2006 for its AMX A-1 fighter aircraft for SEAD missions.

In February 2022, Rafael announced finalization of the development and conduction of flight test of a new generation of Sky Shield for an undisclosed customer.

External links
Deagel.com-Guide to world military aircraft
Rafael website

References 

Rafael Advanced Defense Systems
Electronic countermeasures